Fabián Bordagaray (born 15 February 1987) is an Argentine football forward who currently plays for Belgrano in Primera Nacional.

Career
Bordagaray started his career in 2006 with Defensa y Justicia in the Primera B Nacional (Argentine second division). In 2008, he joined San Lorenzo of the first division, where he debuted under Diego Simeone's coaching.

In January 2011, the forward left San Lorenzo and was loaned from a third-party to River Plate, where he signed an 18-month contract.

In January 2015, Bordagaray signed for Caracas FC.

References

External links
 Argentine Primera statistics at Fútbol XXI  
 
 

Living people
1987 births
Argentine footballers
Argentine expatriate footballers
Sportspeople from Avellaneda
Argentine Primera División players
Primera Nacional players
Chilean Primera División players
Super League Greece players
Venezuelan Primera División players
Ascenso MX players
Defensa y Justicia footballers
San Lorenzo de Almagro footballers
Club Atlético River Plate footballers
Argentinos Juniors footballers
Rangers de Talca footballers
Levadiakos F.C. players
Caracas FC players
Rosario Central footballers
Dorados de Sinaloa footballers
Club Atlético Banfield footballers
Club Atlético Belgrano footballers
Argentine expatriate sportspeople in Chile
Argentine expatriate sportspeople in Greece
Argentine expatriate sportspeople in Venezuela
Argentine expatriate sportspeople in Mexico
Expatriate footballers in Chile
Expatriate footballers in Greece
Expatriate footballers in Venezuela
Expatriate footballers in Mexico
Association football forwards

bg:Родриго Рохас